The Source Presents: Hip Hop Hits, Volume 10 is the tenth annual music compilation album to be contributed by The Source magazine and the final album in the Hip Hop Hits series to date.  Released July 26, 2005, Hip Hop Hits Volume 10 features sixteen hip hop and rap hits (one of them being the bonus track).  It went to number 47 on the Top R&B/Hip Hop Albums chart and number 60 on the Billboard 200 album chart.  The album promoted itself on the cover as the "Hip-Hop Hits 10th Anniversary Edition," which is not exactly accurate since the first volume in the compilation series was released eight years ago, and the previous two compilations were released in the same year the year before.

Two songs went to number one on the R&B and Pop music chart:  Goodies and Lean Back (the only Hot Rap Tracks number one hit on Volume 10).

Track listing
Lean Back - Terror Squad
Nolia Clap - Juvenile, UTP 
Breathe - Fabolous
Go D.J. - Lil' Wayne
Let's Go - Trick Daddy, Lil' Jon and Twista 
Hold You Down - The Alchemist and Mobb Deep   
What U Gon' Do - Lil Jon and Lil' Scrappy
Goodies - Ciara
Dammit Man - Pitbull featuring Piccallo
Certified Gangstas - Jim Jones, The Game, Jay Bezel and Cam'ron
Neva Eva - Trillville
Wide Body - Benzino
Vibrate - Petey Pablo
Yes Yes Y'all - Geto Boys
Y'all Heard of Me - C Murder and B.G.
What's Really Good - Benzino and Scarface

References

Hip hop compilation albums
2005 compilation albums
Image Entertainment compilation albums